Peter E. Tarlow (born May 4, 1946) is a rabbi and was the executive director of Texas A&M Hillel from 1983 to 2013. He is a scholar in the area of tourism safety, a consultant for the tourism industry, and the founder of Tourism & More Inc. He worked as a security consultant to the city of Arlington, Texas, in  preparation for Super Bowl XLV. Tarlow's scholarship in tourism and security has been relied upon by mainstream media for his expertise. He is the author of "Event Risk Management and Safety," which was reviewed by Security Management magazine in 2003 and 2005. In 2007 he was a speaker at The Intelligence Summit. His Ph.D. is in sociology and aside from his work at Texas A&M, he "teaches 'tourism safety' to police chiefs around the world".

Tarlow was ordained as a Reform rabbi at Hebrew Union College in 1974, and served as Assistant Rabbi at Temple Emanuel in Worcester, Massachusetts, from 1974 to 1977.

He is married to Sara Alpern and has two children and one stepchild.

See also
History of the Jews in Brazos County, Texas

References

1946 births
Living people
Place of birth missing (living people)
American Reform rabbis
Jews and Judaism in Brazos County, Texas
Texas A&M University faculty
People from College Station, Texas
Rabbis from Texas
21st-century American Jews